Gábor Horváth is a Hungarian sprint canoeist who has competed since 2007. He won four medals at the ICF Canoe Sprint World Championships with two golds (C-4 200 m: 2007, C-4 500: 2007), a silver (C-1 4 x 200 m: 2009), and a bronze (C-4 200 m: 2009).

References
Canoe09.ca profile 

Hungarian male canoeists
Living people
Year of birth missing (living people)
ICF Canoe Sprint World Championships medalists in Canadian
21st-century Hungarian people